Yousef Sheikh Al-Eshra (born 15 January 1979) is a Syrian footballer who played for Syria national football team.

External links
worldfootball.net
11v11.com
Soccerway

1979 births
Syrian footballers
Living people
Syria international footballers
Place of birth missing (living people)
Al-Ittihad Aleppo players
Association football defenders
Syrian Premier League players